The 1999–2000 season was Sheffield Wednesday's 133rd season in existence. They competed in the twenty-team Premier League, the top tier of English football. The club finished nineteenth and were relegated from the Premier League for the first time.

Season summary
Barring the opening-day 2-1 home defeat to Liverpool, Sheffield Wednesday were in the bottom three all season long. A very poor start to the season saw the club fail to win any of their first nine league games (gaining just one solitary point away to Premier League newcomers Bradford City) and an 8–0 hammering at the hands of Newcastle United in September
 saw most people tip the club as favourites for relegation, and this opinion was further strengthened by their failure to make a substantial improvement as the season went on as they won just once in their first 17 games (twice in their first 20). The cups offered little respite, with the Owls getting to the fourth round of the League Cup before losing to Division One side Bolton Wanderers, while in the FA Cup they needed a replay to beat Wolverhampton Wanderers (albeit the first leg only ended in a draw thanks to a Wolves goal that replays showed had been awarded incorrectly), before suffering a humiliating exit to Division Two side Gillingham.

Despite this, chairman Dave Richards steadfastly refused to sack manager Danny Wilson, and his patience was rewarded with an improved run of form after Christmas, which saw just one defeat in five games. However, the team's form slumped once again after that, and Richards departed to become chairman of the Premier League early in 2000. The remaining directors decided that enough was enough and on 21 March, Wilson's managerial contract was terminated, three days after an appalling 1-0 defeat away to a struggling Watford side who had previously won only once in their previous 20 league games.

Peter Shreeves, who had previously been assistant to Wilson's predecessor, Ron Atkinson, took temporary charge, and kept the Owls in contention for survival right up to the penultimate day of the season. A failure to beat Arsenal confirmed their relegation after nine successive seasons of top division football, but they did manage a 3–3 draw at Highbury. Bradford City manager Paul Jewell was then given the uphill task of restoring Premier League football to the club, though the club's mounting debts triggered fears that further struggles would lie ahead.

Final league table

Results summary

Results by round

Results
Sheffield Wednesday's score comes first

Legend

FA Premier League

FA Cup

League Cup

Players

First-team squad
Squad at end of season

Left club during season

Reserve squad

Transfers

In

Out

Transfers in:  £5,000,000
Transfers out:  £2,730,000
Total spending:  £2,270,000

Statistics

Appearances and goals

Players with no appearances not included in the list

|-
|colspan="14"|Players featured for club who have left:

|}
Source:

Disciplinary record

Source:

References

Notes

Sheffield Wednesday F.C. seasons
Sheffield Wednesday